The County of Lupfen ( or the Landgraviate of Lupfen-Stühlingen (sometimes referred to as "Stühlingen" was a territory based in Hohenlupfen Castle in Talheim, where the rulers of House of Lupfen resided, which is first mentioned in 1065. Its possessions included territories in Alsace and Baden-Württemberg. It was closely associated to Stühlingen, Germany. It was not a state in the modern sense, but one of the many feudal territories held by noble houses in the Middle Ages.

History 
Hohenlupfen Castle, the residence of the Lupfens in Talheim was first documented in 1065.

In 1251, the counts of Lupfen inherited the Landgraviate of Stühlingen. The current coat of arms of the town of Stühlingen is derived from this. The year prior, the County of Bonndorf was also inherited by them. The large territorial acquisitions allowed the counts to call themselves Landgraves.

The Lupfens inherited Groß-Rappoltstein and Hohenack in 1398 through marriage with the former wife of the last count.

In 1420, The Hohenlupfen castle in Talheim was abandoned for Stühlingen/Hohenlupfen Castle, in Stühlingen.

In 1582, the last count of Lupfen, Heinrich IV died at 39 years old with no male descendants. Because of this, the House of Lupfen went extinct and the lands were divided between the nephew of his through his sister, belonging to the house of Mörsberg, and the Marshals of Pappenheim.

See also 

 House of Lupfen
 Stühlingen

References 

States and territories established in 1065
Waldshut (district)
Heilbronn (district)
1060s establishments in the Holy Roman Empire
States and territories disestablished in 1582
Swabian Circle
Former states and territories of Baden-Württemberg
Lupfen